Edinburgh Castle Rock may refer to:
Edinburgh Castle sits on a volcanic plug called Castle Rock
Edinburgh rock, a Scottish confection sometimes known as Edinburgh Castle Rock